Abumusa County is in Hormozgan province, Iran. The capital of the county is the city of Abu Musa. At the 2006 census, the county's population was 1,860 in 505 households. The following census in 2011 counted 5,263 people in 679 households. At the 2016 census, the county's population was 7,402 in 924 households.

Administrative divisions

The population history and structural changes of Abumusa County's administrative divisions over three consecutive censuses are shown in the following table. The latest census shows two districts, two rural districts, and one city.

References

 

Counties of Hormozgan Province